Tamasio is a former municipality in the Karditsa regional unit, Thessaly, Greece. Since the 2011 local government reform it is part of the municipality Sofades, of which it is a municipal unit. The municipal unit has an area of 163.504 km2. Population 2,962 (2011). The seat of the municipality was in Leontari.

References

Populated places in Karditsa (regional unit)

el:Δήμος Σοφάδων#Ταμασίου